Stachyandra is a plant genus in the family Picrodendraceae first described as a genus in 1990.

The entire genus is endemic to Madagascar.

species
 Stachyandra imberbis (Airy Shaw) Radcl.-Sm.
 Stachyandra merana (Airy Shaw) J.-F.Leroy ex Radcl.-Sm.
 Stachyandra rufibarbis (Airy Shaw) Radcl.-Sm.
 Stachyandra viticifolia (Airy Shaw) Radcl.-Sm.

See also
Taxonomy of the Picrodendraceae

References

Picrodendraceae
Malpighiales genera
Endemic flora of Madagascar